Lord Hutton may refer to:

Brian Hutton, Baron Hutton (1932-2020), British former judge and Lord of Appeal
John Hutton, Baron Hutton of Furness (born 1955), former British Labour politician